Raymond William Maluta (born July 24, 1954) is a Canadian retired professional ice hockey player who played 25 games in the National Hockey League for the Boston Bruins between 1975 and 1976. Maluta was born in Flin Flon, Manitoba.

Maluta scored just two goals in his NHL career, but one of them was the first Boston goal of the 1976-77 season.  It was scored against Pete LoPresti of the Minnesota North Stars in Boston's 6-2 victory.

From 1999 until early 2012, he was the executive general manager of the Sports Centre at MCC in Brighton, New York.  He became a consultant to the facility in January 2012 when Rory Fitzpatrick was named general manager.

In 2007, Maluta became the head coach of the United States national ice sledge hockey team, leading them to a bronze medal in the International Paralympic Committee World Championship in 2008 and a gold medal in 2009.

Career statistics

Regular season and playoffs

References

External links
 

1954 births
Living people
Canadian people of Italian descent
Boston Bruins draft picks
Boston Bruins players
Canadian ice hockey defencemen
EC Red Bull Salzburg players
Flin Flon Bombers players
Ice hockey people from Manitoba
Rochester Americans players
San Diego Mariners draft picks
Sportspeople from Flin Flon